Pseudolyra is a genus of moths in the family Lasiocampidae. The genus was erected by Per Olof Christopher Aurivillius in 1925.

Species
Pseudolyra bubalitica Tams, 1929
Pseudolyra caiala Tams, 1936
Pseudolyra cervina Aurivillius, 1905
Pseudolyra cinerea Aurivillius, 1901
Pseudolyra despecta Le Cerf, 1922
Pseudolyra distincta Distnat, 1899
Pseudolyra divisa Aurivillius, 1925
Pseudolyra lineadentata Bethune-Baker, 1911
Pseudolyra major Hering, 1941
Pseudolyra megista Tams, 1931
Pseudolyra minima Hering, 1932
Pseudolyra miona Tams, 1936
Pseudolyra parva Tams, 1931

References

Lasiocampidae